This is a list of airports in Australia. It includes licensed airports, with the exception of private airports. Aerodromes here are listed with their 4-letter ICAO code, and 3-letter IATA code (where available).

A more extensive list can be found in the En Route Supplement Australia (ERSA), available online from the Airservices Australia web site and in the individual lists for each state or territory.

Airports
ICAO location indicators link to the Aeronautical Information Publication Enroute Supplement – Australia (ERSA) facilities (FAC) document, where available.

Airport names shown in bold indicate the airport has scheduled passenger service on commercial airlines. The cities shown in bold are international.

Australian Capital Territory (ACT)

New South Wales (NSW)

Northern Territory (NT)

Queensland (Qld)

South Australia (SA)

Tasmania (Tas)

Victoria (Vic)

Western Australia (WA)

Other territories

Military: Air Force

Military: Army Aviation

Military: Naval Aviation

See also 
 List of the busiest airports in Australia
 List of the busiest air routes in Australia by passenger traffic
 List of ports in Australia
 Australian air traffic control
 Transport in Australia
 Highways in Australia
 List of airports by ICAO code: Y
 Wikipedia:WikiProject Aviation/Airline destination lists: Oceania#Australia

References

Other sources 
 
 
  – includes IATA codes
 AirportGuide: Australia – used to check ICAO and IATA airport codes
 Great Circle Mapper: Australia – used to check IATA airport codes

 
Australia
Airports
 
Australia